Henri Jean Pontoy (5 February 1888 – 1968) was a French painter. His work was part of the painting event in the art competition at the 1924 Summer Olympics.

References

Further reading
 Oxford Art Online: Bénézit Dictionary of Artists - Henri Jean Pontoy (subscription required) 
 Alfred Rousse, 28e salon des artistes orientalistes algériens, 1927.
 Stéphane Richemond, Les Salons des artistes coloniaux, Éditions de l'Amateur, 2003 
 Gérald Schurr and Pierre Cabanne, Dictionnaire des petits maîtres de la peinture, Éditions de l'Amateur, 2003
 Élisabeth Cazenave, Les artistes de l'Algérie, dictionnaire des peintres, sculpteurs, graveurs 1830-1962, Éditions Bernard Giovanangeli, Association Abd-el-tif, 2001

1888 births
1968 deaths
19th-century French painters
20th-century French painters
20th-century French male artists
French male painters
Olympic competitors in art competitions
Artists from Reims
19th-century French male artists